Scottsville is a village in southwestern Monroe County, New York, United States, and is in the northeastern part of the Town of Wheatland. The population was 2,001 at the 2010 census. The village is named after an early settler, Isaac Scott. Most Scottsvillians work in and around the city of Rochester—the village of Scottsville is located about a ten-minute drive from the outer limits of the city.

History 
Isaac Scott, one of the first settlers, arrived in 1790 and purchased  of land from owners who lived in London and Great Britain. This land covered much of what is now the village of Scottsville. Scott's log house was at the southwest corner of Main and Rochester Streets in the village.

The following sites are on the National Register of Historic Places: Isaac Cox Cobblestone Farmstead, Cox–Budlong House, Grace Church, David McVean House, Simeon Sage House, William Shirts House, Union Presbyterian Church, and Windom Hall.  The Rochester Street Historic District is a national historic district listed in 1973.

Geography
Scottsville is located at  (43.021813, -77.753545).

The village is located one mile (1.6 km) west of the junction of Oatka Creek and the Genesee River.

Demographics

As of the census of 2000, there were 2,128 people, 835 households, and 591 families residing in the village. The population density was 1,968.1 people per square mile (760.8/km2). There were 852 housing units at an average density of 788.0 per square mile (304.6/km2). The racial makeup of the village was 91.92% White, 4.32% African American, 0.66% Native American, 0.56% Asian, 0.14% Pacific Islander, 1.08% from other races, and 1.32% from two or more races. Hispanic or Latino of any race were 2.96% of the population.

There were 835 households, out of which 34.7% had children under the age of 18 living with them, 57.0% were married couples living together, 11.0% had a female householder with no husband present, and 29.2% were non-families. 24.9% of all households were made up of individuals, and 10.1% had someone living alone who was 65 years of age or older. The average household size was 2.53 and the average family size was 3.05.

In the village, the population was spread out, with 28.1% under the age of 18, 5.8% from 18 to 24, 28.6% from 25 to 44, 24.4% from 45 to 64, and 13.2% who were 65 years of age or older. The median age was 38 years. For every 100 females, there were 93.6 males. For every 100 females age 18 and over, there were 86.0 males.

The median income for a household in the village was $52,472, and the median income for a family was $61,316. Males had a median income of $43,250 versus $30,781 for females. The per capita income for the village was $24,831. About 1.2% of families and 2.3% of the population were below the poverty line, including 1.7% of those under age 18 and 1.2% of those age 65 or over.

Local government

Village government is headed by the mayor and the Board of Trustees and is located in a recently renovated building at 22 Main Street.

Education
Public schools are under the jurisdiction of the Wheatland-Chili Central School District, and include an elementary school, middle school and high school.

See also
 Scottsville Free Library

References

Villages in New York (state)
Rochester metropolitan area, New York
Villages in Monroe County, New York